Thiago Moura Monteiro (born 31 May 1994) is a Brazilian professional tennis player.

Monteiro has a career-high ATP singles ranking of world No. 61 achieved on 17 October 2022. He also has a career-high ATP doubles ranking of No. 144, achieved on 31 January 2022. He is currently the No. 1 Brazilian tennis player. 

On the ITF Junior Circuit, Monteiro peaked in the rankings at No. 2 on 2 February 2012, with his biggest junior singles title being the Grade A, Copa Gerdau in Porto Alegre, Brazil, in 2011.

In his first ATP match, as a wildcard ranked world No. 338 in the ATP 500 Rio de Janeiro in February 2016, Monteiro upset No. 9 Jo-Wilfried Tsonga in the first round. In the second round, Monteiro lost to eventual champion Pablo Cuevas.
In his next tournament, the ATP 250 São Paulo, Monteiro won two matches (against former World No. 9 Nicolás Almagro, and Daniel Muñoz de la Nava), losing again to eventual champion Cuevas in the quarterfinals.

On May 8, 2016, Monteiro won his first ATP Challenger title in Aix-en-Provence, France. He defeated Carlos Berlocq in the final.

Early and personal life
Thiago Moura Monteiro was born on May 31, 1994, in Fortaleza, Ceará, Brazil. Thiago has three sisters (Letícia, Jéssica, and Flávia) and an older brother, Fáber Monteiro, who works as a real estate broker. His mother, Fátima Monteiro, has been retired since he was a child. Monteiro is fluent in Spanish, Portuguese, and English.

Thiago's first introduction to tennis happened when he first saw his brother watching Gustavo Kuerten on TV, being eight years old. Monteiro trained football at an academy near where his brother used to play tennis. He played it for the first time when his football class was cancelled, and his brother called him to "hit the ball". Thiago soon started training and disputing local tournaments: in early 2004, he won his first tournament, being only nine years old. Thiago would leave his hometown, Fortaleza, in late 2008 to enter the Larri Passos Academy in Balneário Camboriú to improve his game. Thiago says that he would probably be a football player if he had not made that change. Now, as a professional player, Thiago uses his spare time to enjoy movies and spend it with friends and family. He attends college online. He dated fellow Brazilian tennis player Beatriz Haddad Maia for several years.

Junior career
Thiago Monteiro had a successful junior career, winning many tournaments. Monteiro peaked in the ITF Junior Circuit rankings at No. 2 on 2 February 2012. He ended his junior career with a 77–31 win record on singles and 47–32 on doubles.

In 2004, being ten years old, Thiago won the Paraíba Tour Tournament. In 2005, Monteiro won the Fortaleza Cup by beating Evandro Alencar in straight sets on the final. In 2006, he captured the first of three titles at the Banana Bowl, in the category u12. 2008 was a very successful year for Monteiro, both in singles and in doubles. He won the South-America Tournament of Nations, the Torneio Brasileirão, the Guanabara Open de Tênis (4th and 5th stage), all singles tournaments; and the 1st and 2nd stage of Torneio Nacional Rota-do-Sol (both in singles and doubles). Monteiro also conquered his second Banana Bowl title, category u14. Later that year, Thiago was awarded with Troféu Jornalista Flávio Ponte, at the category Personalidade Esportiva do Ano (Sports Personality of the Year).

To focus on his tennis career, Thiago moved from his hometown in Fortaleza, to Balneário Camboriú, in Santa Catarina. This change led Thiago to conquer multiple titles in 2009: Copa Claro (3rd stage) and Credicard MasterCard Junior Cup (2nd and 3rd stage), in singles tournaments, and the doubles titles at XIV Goodyear Junior Cup and the Eddie Herr Tennis Championship. Monteiro was also runner-up at the G1 tournament, Orange Bowl, playing in the singles draw. This same year, he won his first points on the ATP rankings by playing two Futures' events in the doubles category.

Starting in 2010, Thiago was number one in both CBT and COSAT ranking. He won his third and final title at the 40th edition of the Banana Bowl, this time in the u16 category, and also made his debut on the ATP Singles Rankings, with his participation in a Future in his birthplace, in Fortaleza. In 2011, Thiago started the year winning the Grade A Copa Gerdau in Porto Alegre, one of the most important tournaments on the ITF Junior Circuit. At 17 years old, Monteiro also won three other clay tournaments: the Asuncion Bowl, Astrid Bowl, and the Offenbach Tournament. In this last one, he defeated Matias Sborowitz on the final in straight sets.

Thiago didn't achieve much success in singles Grand Slams as a junior: his best results were reaching the third round at the Wimbledon Championships in 2011 and 2012 French Open. He had a better run at doubles: reaching the quarterfinals of the Australian Open and the semifinals at the French Open, both in 2012. Monteiro's last match as a junior was at the 2012 US Open.

Professional career

2011–2013: Early career

In late 2011, Thiago won his first professional title, the Bahia Open, a Future tournament with US$10,000 in money prize. He battled past his training partner Alexandre Schnitman, winning in close, straight sets. This win led Thiago to receive a wildcard entry on the main draw of Aberto de São Paulo, but he was eliminated on the first round by compatriot André Ghem.

2012 was the last junior year for Monteiro. He played in all junior Grand Slams except Wimbledon and focused on Futures and Challengers tournaments. Monteiro managed to qualify at 2012 Aberto de Florianópolis, in late February, but he was eliminated in the first round by Thiago Alves. In late May, Thiago won his second Futures title, this time on clay, in Bauru. The final was a thrilling three-hour victory over Leonardo Kirche, with Monteiro winning despite losing the first set. The Brazilian was runner-up on two other Futures played in Brazil: at São José do Rio Preto in August and at Porto Alegre in October. Thiago ended the year with a career ranking of 439, after starting the year at the position 701.

Entering 2013 as the first year that Thiago would play a full season as a senior professional, he was invited a second time to enter Aberto de São Paulo main draw, but couldn't make the first round again, losing to countryman Guilherme Clezar in straight sets. Monteiro later played in consecutive Futures events in the United States without much success. He tried to break through the qualifiers of Brasil Open a month later, but lost to Thiago Alves in the first round. In March, Thiago did a very successful run in Turkey: he won two back-to-back Futures, with 15 consecutive victories over two weeks. His first title there was against Czech Jan Minar, winning in straight sets. A week later, he defeated the Dominican José Hernández also in straight sets. He also won his first Futures title in doubles, partnering Maximiliano Estévez, from Argentina, defeating in the finals the partnership of Kirill Dmitriev and Yaraslav Shyla in the super tiebreak.

Thiago would also reach the finals of another Futures event, this time in the Netherlands, in June, but he couldn't win his 5th title. He lost in the final to Bjorn Fratangelo in three sets. Thiago broke through multiple Challenger qualifiers later in the year, including Sport 1 Open in Netherlands, the Poznań Open in Poland, the Oberstaufen Cup in Germany, and the Uruguay Open. His best results were in the quarterfinals in Germany and Netherlands, a performance he also achieved in IS Open and Aberto Rio Preto, but he didn't need to play the qualifiers in the latter. In doubles, Thiago reached the finals of Tetra Pak Tennis Cup partnering Thiago Alves, but they lost in straight sets against the Argentinian team of Guido Andreozzi and Máximo González. He also reached the semifinals of IS Open and Aberto Rio Preto, partnering Thiago Alves in the first and Rogério Dutra Silva in the latter, achieving his career high in the doubles ranking: 449th. He ended in the 276th position in the singles ranking.

2014–2015: Injuries, Second doubles title
Thiago's year started only in late February due to an injury on his left knee. He attempted to qualify to Brasil Open, but lost in the second round to Dušan Lajović in straight sets. In March, Thiago qualified to Visit Panamá Cup, defeating Alexander Zverev on his way, but Monteiro lost in the first round. Thiago's 5th Futures title came in late June, in the Netherlands, where he defeated Boy Westerhof in three sets. Thiago was not able to repeat his runs in the Challenger Tour as he did in 2013. His rank dropped down to 563rd by the end of the year. In doubles, Thiago reached the finals of two Futures (one in Netherlands, one in Dominican Republic), but wasn't able to win his 2nd title in either.

Trying to recover his positions in the ATP rankings, Thiago tried to break through multiple qualifiers of ATP World Tour tournaments. He attempted to do so in clay events, reaching the final qualifying round in the Argentina Open and the U.S. Men's Clay Court Championships, losing respectively to Facundo Bagnis and Rogério Dutra Silva. While his run on qualifiers wasn't much successful on the ATP World Tour, Thiago had better success at the ATP Challenger Tour. Over the year, Thiago entered 11 qualifier draws, breaking through 5 of them. Monteiro's also played his last Futures event to date, playing two weeks in Georgia in both singles and doubles. Partnering with the Italian Marco Bortolotti, the left-hander won his 2nd Futures title by defeating the Russian partnership of Victor Badula and Ivan Kalinin in straight sets.

Almost a month later, playing in the qualifiers of Poprad-Tatry ATP Challenger Tour, Thiago badly injured his left knee while holding a match point against Czech Robin Stanek and was forced to retire. He stayed away from the courts for three months, returning in the Campeonato Internacional de Tênis de Campinas qualifiers. Monteiro lost in the final qualifying round to Tiago Lopes in three sets. The Brazilian best run at a Challenger event was in November, at the Challenger Ciudad de Guayaquil, passing through the qualifiers and reaching the quarter-finals, where he had to retire against the eventual runner-up, Guido Pella. Thiago ended in the 470th position in the singles ranking.

2016: ATP World Tour and top 100 debut, Maiden Challenger Title
Ranked at the beginning of the year at No. 463, Thiago started strong, qualifying to Torneo de Mendoza main draw and reaching the quarterfinals, where Monteiro lost to eventual champion Gerald Melzer in straight sets. The left-hander received a wildcard invite to Vivo Tennis Cup main draw, where he reached the semifinals of a Challenger event for the first time, losing again to the 'would-be' champion of the tournament, this time to Facundo Bagnis. 

This performance led him to receive a wildcard into Rio Open main draw where he would face Jo-Wilfried Tsonga, the third seed and world No. 9 at the time. Thiago (ranked No. 338) stunned Tsonga in three sets, to set a meeting with Pablo Cuevas. Monteiro lost in straight sets, and his opponent won the tournament, defeating Guido Pella in the final. The surprise performance led Monteiro to receive a second wildcard, this time to play into Brasil Open main draw. Thiago started strong, defeating two Spaniards, Nicolás Almagro in the first round and Daniel Muñoz de la Nava in the second, to reach the third round and set another battle against Pablo Cuevas. Thiago triumphed in the first set this time, but Cuevas turned the game and won the match. Cuevas also won this tournament, beating Pablo Carreño Busta in the final.

After rising 98 positions in the rankings, Thiago returned to play on Challenger events, this time all over America. Playing in four tournaments, he reached the semifinals in two of them. The first one was the Challenger ATP Cachantún Cup, where he lost to countryman Rogério Dutra Silva, in March. The other semifinal was his second Challenger event in Brazil in 2016, the São Paulo Challenger de Tênis, where seeded third, he lost to Gonzalo Lama in three sets.

Returning to Europe, Thiago entered the Open du Pays d'Aix draw unseeded, and with a strong performance, he conquered the title by beating Carlos Berlocq in the final. Thiago played two other tournaments without the same success, before entering the French Open qualifying draw as the 30th seed. Monteiro was beaten in straight sets by Ruben Bemelmans. A week later, Monteiro had a rematch with Bemelmans in the first round of the Franken Challenge, defeating him in straight sets. Thiago later lost in the quarterfinals to Tobias Kamke. Playing in another clay tournament in France, Monteiro reached a second Challenger final, this time at the Open Sopra Steria de Lyon. Seeded 5th, he faced another Belgian this time, Steve Darcis. The left-hander took the first set, but the Belgian grew in the match, turning it into three sets.

Before attempting to qualify for his second Grand Slam, Monteiro played at the Internationaux de Tennis de Blois but withdrew from the second round match against Miljan Zekić, citing a back injury. At the Wimbledon Championships qualifying, Thiago was eliminated again in the first round, this time to Julian Reister. To improve his position in the ATP rankings, Thiago attempted and qualified for the German Open main draw. The Brazilian won three matches against three Germans players (two in the qualifiers, and Mischa Zverev in the main draw), to set a third match against Pablo Cuevas. Cuevas delivered Monteiro's third loss in the ATP World Tour, but this time he did not win the tournament, being runner-up instead. Thiago qualified for a consecutive World Tour appearance this time at Swiss Open Gstaad. Monteiro was defeated by Robin Haase in the third round. The Brazilian defeated Antoine Bellier in the first round and the second seed, and top 30 Gilles Simon in the second round.

Attempting to break into the top 100, Monteiro entered as the top seed in the BB&T Atlanta Open qualifiers. He breezed past American Trent Bryde, winning in straight sets and recording a bagel, but lost to Christopher Eubanks in straight sets, at the final round. However, Rajeev Ram withdrew from the tournament, and Monteiro was awarded a lucky loser entry into the main draw. Unfortunately for Thiago, he didn't have the same luck during the first round match, against Tim Smyczek. Monteiro had the opportunity to serve for the match at 5–4 during the second set, but Smyczek denied his chances and won the match in three sets. Thiago also did his debut in doubles in Atlanta, playing with Yoshihito Nishioka, but they lost at the super tiebreak against American partnership of Zack Kennedy and Christopher Eubanks. 

A week later, Thiago entered directly into the main draw of an ATP event for the first time, the Los Cabos Open; but lost in the first round to Dušan Lajović in straight sets.

Thiago finally broke the Top 100 milestone after winning in the first round of the Western & Southern Open qualifiers against veteran Ivan Dodig in straight sets. However, Thiago failed to qualify as he lost in the final round to Jiří Veselý in three sets. The win also won Monteiro the second spot in the Brazilian Top 10 singles for the first time in his career. Later at the end of August, Thiago tried to qualify at the US Open, but for the third time in the qualifiers, he lost at the first round. After the US Open, Thiago was invited for the first time to play in the Davis Cup. He entered the team to play against Belgium, opening the rubbers against David Goffin. Monteiro lost in straight sets, and Brazil finished the series 0–4. Following his unsuccessful run at the Davis Cup, Thiago entered the Campeonato Internacional de Tenis de Santos as the 2nd seed. He went on to his third Challenger final, losing in straight sets to Renzo Olivo. Thiago ended his year with two other quarterfinals (Campinas and Buenos Aires) and a semifinal (Santiago) appearance at Challenger events.

2017: Grand Slam debut

Thiago started his year at Chennai Open, losing in the first round to Daniil Medvedev. A week later, he entered the Sydney International qualifiers drew and passed through it, but he came short again in the first round, losing to Daniel Evans. 
Ranked No. 83, Thiago's ranking was enough for him to enter the Australian Open main draw directly. He set a rematch against Jo-Wilfried Tsonga but could not reproduce the tennis from their first match, losing in four sets. 

Entering the Ecuador Open, Monteiro's performance was disappointing; he lost another match in the first round, this time to Giovanni Lapentti. He also entered the doubles draw there, playing with Thomaz Bellucci, but they came short in the first round. Playing on Argentinian soil, Monteiro passed the first round, defeating ex-top 10 Tommy Robredo en route to the quarterfinals of the Argentina Open, before losing to local player Carlos Berlocq in three sets. 
Monteiro made a consecutive quarterfinal appearance, this time at Rio Open, beating Gastão Elias and compatriot Thomaz Bellucci before losing to Casper Ruud. Entering another his home tournament, the Brasil Open, Thiago lost for the second time in a row to Carlos Berlocq.

A couple of weeks later, in his Masters 1000 main draw debut at Indian Wells Masters, Monteiro lost in a close match to Martin Kližan, losing a set point in the first set tiebreak and six break point opportunities overall. In another close match, Monteiro was also eliminated in the first round of the Miami Open, this time by Viktor Troicki in three sets.

Following the first two Masters of the season, Monteiro played two singles rubbers for his country at the Davis Cup, winning both to help Brazil win 5–0 against Ecuador, classifying his country to the World Group Play-offs. Starting the spring clay court season, he entered the U.S. Men's Clay Court Championships main draw. At the maroon clay courts, Thiago defeated seventh seed Donald Young in straight sets but lost in three to Ernesto Escobedo. At the Barcelona Open, Thiago qualified for the main draw, but lost to Daniel Evans in the first round. A week after, in the first round of BMW Open, he lost to Marius Copil.

2020–2022: French Open third round, Olympics & top 65 debut
Monteiro reached the first Grand Slam third round in his career at the 2020 French Open defeating 31st seed Nikoloz Basilashvili, and Marcos Giron before he lost to Márton Fucsovics.

At the 2021 Australian Open, he reached the second round for the first time at this Major, where he lost to world No. 8 Andrey Rublev.

In July 2021, Monteiro qualified to represent Brazil at the 2020 Summer Olympics.

In 2022, Monteiro won his seventh Challenger in Salzburg, beating Norbert Gombos in the final, reaching a career-high of world No. 73 on 11 July 2022 in the ATP rankings.
He won his first match at the US Open defeating Alex Molcan, reaching the second round for the first time at this Major.

He reached a new career-high ranking of world No. 61 on 17 October 2022 following his title at the 2022 AON Open Challenger in Genoa, Italy.

2023
At his home tournament, the 2023 Rio Open he defeated former No. 3 Dominic Thiem in three sets in the first round for his first win of the season. He lost to second seed and eventual winner Cameron Norrie. The following week at the 2023 Chile Open he reached the quarterfinals defeating fifth seed Albert Ramos Viñolas and Marco Cecchinato.

Playing style

Monteiro's game is based primarily on a baseline game, with topspin groundstrokes to counterpunch the opponents' attacks. Thiago constantly uses his lefty forehand to move his opponents around the court, winning most points with it. Being a left-hander that is more acquainted with clay courts, his style is somewhat similar to one of his idols, Rafael Nadal.

Even though he trained in clay courts during most of his tennis life, Monteiro's adaptation to hard courts especially was noted by critics in 2016. On these surfaces, Thiago varies his game more, using volleys and slices more than on clay.

Equipment and endorsements
As of October 2014, Monteiro has been training at Tennis Route Academy, at Rio de Janeiro, where other prominent Brazilian players train, including Marcelo Demoliner and Beatriz Haddad Maia. Lacoste was Thiago's clothing brand until January 2017, when he signed with the Spanish brand Joma. He uses Babolat racquets. Other sponsors include Elemidia (since February 2017), Correios, and Fundação Beto Studart (since 2009).

Singles performance timeline

Current through the Erste Bank Open.

Record against other players

Record against top 10 players 
Monteiro's match record against those who have been ranked in the top 10 (ATP World Tour, Grand Slam, and Davis Cup main draw matches). Active players in bold.

Top 10 wins 
Monteiro's match record against players in the top 10 at the time of the match (ATP World Tour, Grand Slam, and Davis Cup main draw matches).

National representation

Davis Cup
As a Junior, Thiago participated in the Junior Davis Cup, playing in 2010. The Brazilian team finished in the 7th position that year.

As a senior, Thiago Monteiro was first nominated to play for Brazil in Davis Cup after reaching the No. 2 spot in singles for his country. He played against Belgium in 2016, with Brazil losing the tie 0–4, and returning to the Zonal Group. Thiago was later nominated to play against Ecuador in 2017. He won his two matches, including the final match of the tie (a dead rubber).
Monteiro was the no.1 singles player for Brazil against a Japanese team who missed most of its top players in a tie to decide a World Group spot for 2018. However, Brazil failed to capitalize on the opportunity, with Monteiro losing both matches.

Being the team singles No.1 for a second time, this turn against the Dominican Republic, Monteiro failed to confirm his ranking superiority, losing his second match against No.184 José Hernández-Fernández after winning against Roberto Cid Subervi. Brazil went on to win the tie 3–2, anyway, in the 1st round of the 2018 Davis Cup Americas Zone Group I.

Currently, Thiago sports a 7–6 record in Davis Cup matches. He has played only singles matches thus far.

Challenger and Futures finals

Singles: 21 (13–8)

Doubles: 6 (2–4)

Notes

References

External links

1994 births
Living people
Brazilian male tennis players
Brazilian people of Portuguese descent
Sportspeople from Fortaleza
Competitors at the 2010 South American Games
Olympic tennis players of Brazil
Tennis players at the 2020 Summer Olympics